Baba I village (Papiakum) is one of the four villages that make up Babessi subdivision and one of the thirteen villages of Ngoketunjia division of the North West region of Cameroon. Baba I village is located along the ring road from Bamenda some 50 km away from Bamenda town on the Bamenda-Nkambe stretch of the ring road just before one reaches Bamunka (Ndop town).

Baba 1 has one of the highest population density with a population of over 35000. The village is at present suffering from rural exodus, as most of the inhabitants have moved to big cities like Bamenda, Douala and Yaounde.

In September 2015, floods rendered thousands of villagers homeless after water overflowed its banks. The floods were blamed on the poor construction of part of the ring road without culverts.

See also
Communes of Cameroon

References

Further reading 
http://wikimapia.org/10647160/Baba-1-Fon-s-Palace

Populated places in Northwest Region (Cameroon)